The Sikorski Glacier is a small glacier in the north-eastern part of the Noville Peninsula, Thurston Island, Ellsworth Land, Antarctica. It flows north-east to the Bellingshausen Sea between Mount Palmer and Mount Feury. It was first roughly delineated from aerial photos taken by the USN's Operation Highjump in 1946–47. It was named by the Advisory Committee on Antarctic Names (US-ACAN) for Stephen Sikorski, electronics technician on USS Glacier, who assisted in setting up an automatic weather station on Thurston Island during the USN's Bellingshausen Sea Expedition in February 1960.

Important Bird Area
A 316 ha site on fast ice north of the glacier has been designated an Important Bird Area (IBA) by BirdLife International because it supports a breeding colony of about 3,500 emperor penguins, based on 2009 satellite imagery.

See also
 List of glaciers in the Antarctic
 Glaciology

Maps
 Thurston Island – Jones Mountains. 1:500000 Antarctica Sketch Map. US Geological Survey, 1967.
 Antarctic Digital Database (ADD). Scale 1:250000 topographic map of Antarctica. Scientific Committee on Antarctic Research (SCAR), 1993–2016.

References

 

Important Bird Areas of Antarctica
Penguin colonies
Glaciers of Thurston Island